This is a list of current and former presidents of the Philippines by time in office that consists of the 17 presidents in the history of the Philippines. The basis of the list is counted by the number of calendar days.

Rank by time in office

Updated daily according to UTC.

Sources
inq7.net
pangulo.ph
Count day

Philippine presidents by time in office
Time in Office, List of Philippine Presidents by